Giridhar Gamang (born 8 April 1943) is a former leader of the Indian National Congress and Bharatiya Janata Party and a former Chief Minister of Odisha. He has resigned BJP in 2023. He was born at Dibirisingi village in Rayagada district of Odisha. In 1972, he was elected for the first time to the 5th Lok Sabha from Koraput. Subsequently, he was re-elected to the Lok Sabha in 1977, 1980, 1984, 1989, 1991, 1996, 1998 and 2004. He was the Chief Minister of Odisha from 17 February 1999 to 6 December 1999.

His wife, Hema Gamang, won from Koraput constituency in the 1999 elections to the 13th Lok Sabha, while he was serving as the Chief Minister of Odisha.

In 1998, while he was a member of the 12th parliament, he was asked to become Chief minister of Odisha. Two months later, there was a vote-of-confidence against the BJP government and Giridhar still went to the parliament to vote against the government as he was from congress (despite the fact that he had to quit either being CM or the MP office and become MLA, within 6 months). The government lost power by 1 vote (269–270) and it is widely believed that if Giridhar had abstained, the speaker, G. M. C. Balayogi would have used his vote to save the government in case of tie. The fall of government resulted in another fresh general election in May 1999.

He lost the Koraput Lok Sabha seat for the first time in the 2009 elections to Jayaram Pangi of the Biju Janata Dal.

In January 2023 he quit Bharatiya Janata Party to join Bharat Rashtra Samithi.

References

1943 births
Living people
Indian National Congress politicians
India MPs 2004–2009
India MPs 1971–1977
India MPs 1977–1979
India MPs 1980–1984
India MPs 1984–1989
India MPs 1989–1991
India MPs 1991–1996
India MPs 1996–1997
India MPs 1998–1999
Lok Sabha members from Odisha
Chief Ministers of Odisha
People from Rayagada district
People from Koraput district
Chief ministers from Indian National Congress
Bharatiya Janata Party politicians from Odisha